Puerto Rican singer Luis Fonsi has released ten studio albums, two compilation albums, 49 singles and two DVDs.

Albums

Studio albums

Compilation albums

Remix albums

Singles

As lead artist

As featured artist

Other charted songs

Guest appearances 
These songs have not appeared on a studio album by Fonsi.

Other collaborations

Notes

References 

Discographies of Puerto Rican artists
Latin pop music discographies